The 1987–88 SM-liiga season was the 13th season of the SM-liiga, the top level of ice hockey in Finland. 10 teams participated in the league, and Tappara Tampere won the championship.

Standings

Playoffs

Semifinals
 Ilves - Lukko 0:3 (1:4, 3:4, 2:6)
 HIFK - Tappara 2:3 (4:1, 0:5, 6:2, 3:15, 5:6 P)

3rd place
 Ilves - HIFK 2:6

Final
 Tappara - Lukko 4:1 (2:3, 4:1, 3:1, 3:0, 5:2)

Relegation
 KooKoo - Kiekkoreipas 3:2 (4:3, 1:5, 3:4, 4:3, 8:5)

External links
 SM-liiga official website

1987–88 in Finnish ice hockey
Fin
Liiga seasons